The enzyme ethanolamine-phosphate phospho-lyase (EC 4.2.3.2) catalyzes the chemical reaction

ethanolamine phosphate + H2O  acetaldehyde + NH3 + phosphate

This enzyme belongs to the family of lyases, specifically those carbon-oxygen lyases acting on phosphates.  The systematic name of this enzyme class is ethanolamine-phosphate phosphate-lyase (deaminating; acetaldehyde-forming). Other names in common use include O-phosphoethanolamine-phospholyase, amino alcohol O-phosphate phospholyase, ''O''-phosphorylethanol-amine phospho-lyase, and ethanolamine-phosphate phospho-lyase (deaminating).  It employs one cofactor, pyridoxal phosphate.

References

 
 

EC 4.2.3
Pyridoxal phosphate enzymes
Enzymes of unknown structure